Geoffrey Marshall may refer to:

Geoffrey Marshall (constitutionalist) (1929–2003), British constitutional theorist
Sir Geoffrey Marshall (physician) (1887–1982), British president of the Royal Society of Medicine
Geoffrey Marshall (priest) (born 1948), Anglican priest and former dean of Brecon Cathedral
Geoff Marshall, video producer, performer and author